The 70th Mixed Brigade was a unit of the Spanish Republican Army created during the Spanish Civil War. The unit intervened in the battles of Jarama, Guadalajara and Brunete. At the end of the war it played a role in the Casado coup.

History 
The unit was created in Madrid on January 15, 1937, from the Free Spain Column of Alicante and Murcia; command of the new unit was handed over to Eusebio Sanz Asensio. The 70th Mixed Brigade was initially reserved for the Madrid Army Corps.

On February 7, after having armed all its battalions, it was initially located in Madrid as a reserve to intervene in the Battle of Jarama. Attached to the 11th Division of Enrique Líster, the 70th MB took part in the fighting that developed around Pingarrón, between February 19 and 22; the unit lost half of its troops during these days, without being able to conquer the disputed position. Moved to the rear, it underwent a reorganization.

The 70th MB received a new command, the largest of the militias Rafael Gutiérrez Caro, and was assigned to the 14th Division commanded by Cipriano Mera. She was immediately sent to fight in the Battle of Guadalajara. The 70th MB carried out the main attack on Brihuega, a town it took on March 18; this action put an end to the offensive of the Corpo Truppe Volontarie. The brigade continued its advance and on March 28 it reached kilometer 98 of the N-II. 

Between March 31 and April 16, it participated in a failed offensive in the area of Tajuña. In July it intervened in the Battle of Brunete, under the command of the José Luzón Morales. On July 22, it carried out an attack from Villanueva de la Cañada to reach the first houses of Brunete, but suffered a high number of casualties.

In the spring of 1938 the unit was sent to the Levante front to reinforce the republican forces resisting the nationalist offensive. On April 27, it reached the Levante and was sent to the battle front; the 70th MB defended La Iglesuela del Cid (May 12) and Alfondeguilla (June 4). Later it returned to the Central front, being assigned again to the 14th Division. Between January 7 and 15, 1939, it participated in a small offensive on the Madrid Front that sought to alleviate the situation of the republican forces in Catalonia, but the offensive ended in failure.

In March 1939, the 70th MB participated in the Casado coup, in favor of the casadista side. On the morning of March 6, the unit's forces occupied various points in Madrid, among others the Alameda de Osuna, the  Ministry of Finance and the Telefónica building. Subsequently, it fought heavily with the 8th Division in defense of the Jaca Position, which was lost. After the triumph of the coup, most of the rebel forces returned to their original positions, although the 70th Mixed Brigade remained in Madrid for if an anti-Casado revolt occurred again. The command of the brigade passed to Bernabé López Calle, as he was considered more reliable than his predecessor – José Luzón Morales. The 70th MB dissolved itself with the surrender of Madrid, on March 28, 1939.

Command 
Commanders
 Eusebio Sanz Asensio;
 Rafael Gutiérrez Caro;
 Francisco Arderiu Perales;
 José Luzón Morales;
 Bernabé López Calle

Commissars
 José Ladrón de Guevara

See also 
 Free Spain Column
 Mixed Brigades

Notes

References

Bibliography 

Military units and formations established in 1937
Military units and formations disestablished in 1939
Mixed Brigades (Spain)
Militarized anarchist formations